Lucas Monteiro Fernandes (born 25 May 2001) is a Swiss footballer who plays as a right back for Chênois.

Playing career
On 7 July 2020, Monteiro signed his first professional contract with Servette. Monteiro made his professional debut with Servette in a 2–2 Swiss Super League tie with Basel on 19 July 2020.

References

External links

SFV U19 Profile
SFL Profile

Living people
2001 births
Sportspeople from the canton of Geneva
Swiss men's footballers
Swiss people of Brazilian descent
Association football fullbacks
Servette FC players
Étoile Carouge FC players
CS Chênois players
2. Liga Interregional players
Swiss Super League players
Swiss Promotion League players
Swiss 1. Liga (football) players